The 1960–61 season saw Rochdale compete for their second season in the Football League Fourth Division.

Statistics
																												
																												
				
				
				
				
				
				
				
				
				
				
				
				
				
				
				
				
				
				
				
				
				
				
				
				

|}

Final League Table

Competitions

Football League Fourth Division

F.A. Cup

League Cup

Lancashire Cup

References

Rochdale A.F.C. seasons
Rochdale